The Lady's workbox in the Judges' Lodgings Museum, Lancaster, was made in 1808 in Lancaster by Gillows (trading as Robert Gillow and Brothers).

It is documented in the Gillow Estimate Sketchbooks in 1808. The recipient was Miss Elizabeth Gifford of Nerquis Hall. The workbox is decorated with 72 'rare and curious woods'. The craftsman was Francis Dowbiggin, son of Thomas Dowbiggin.

Gillows
 
Gillows, also known as Gillow & Co., was a furniture making firm based in Lancaster and London. It was founded in Lancaster in about 1730 by Robert Gillow (1704-1772).  The Robert Gillow of the box would be the founder's grandson, Robert [iii] Gillow, whose brothers George [ii] Gillow; and Richard [iii] Gillow joined the family firm.
Gillows was owned by the family until 1814.

As a result of Lancaster's Atlantic triangular trade, much timber was imported from the Caribbean.  However, the port was going into decline about the time the box was made. Lancaster was barred from taking part in the slave trade in 1799 and the slave trade was abolished in the British Empire in 1807.

The marquetry

The workbox is decorated with marquetry using 72 "rare and curious woods". The interest is twofold, firstly it gives samples of 75 types of woods giving their 18th century names, and secondly it gives an insight into the woods then available in Lancaster.

Catalogue of the Specimens of Curious Woods (English and Foreign) Introduced in a W0RK- BOX, made for Miss GIFFARD, of Nerquis, by ROBERT GILLOW and BROTHERS, of Lancaster, in August, 1808.

 English Oak
 Spanish Mahogany
 Sycamore
 Tulip Wood
 Sandal
 Partridge Wood
 East India Yew
 Zebra
 Orange Wood
 Jamaica Satinwood
 King Wood
 Dutch Elm
 Iron Wood
 Guietiety
 Manganiel
 Rose Wood
 East India Satinwood
 Caracoa
 Canary Wood
 Botany Bay Wood
 Yellow Sander
 Casuarina Wood
 Black Ebony
 Holly
 Brown Ebony
 Green Ebony
 Angola Wood
 Tamarind Wood
 Amboyna Wood
 Purple Wood
 Gambia Wood
 English Yew
 Snake Wood
 St Johns Wood
 Guiana Wood
 Ceylon Wood
 Havannah Wood
 English Pear Tree
 Brazils Wood
 Nova Scotia Wood
 Calmandra
 Camphire Wood
 English Maple
 Mangrove
 Grove Wood
 Mill Wood
 Italian Walnut
 Wood Sandford
 Cape Wood
 Honduras Satinwood
 Kangaroo Wood
 English Apple Tree
 Box
 Brown Box
 Air wood
 American Yew
 American Maple
 Hiccory
 Plane Tree
 English Oak, cut from Framing of Lancaster Castle old gates
 Fustic
 Mexican Wood
 Plumb Tree
 Poplar Tree
 Moss Oak
 White Ebony
 Manilla
 Barr Wood
 American Beech
 Dutch Oak
 English Beech
 English Ash

Savacue Wood, Parama wood and Orange Wood were used to frame the samples

References

Bibliography

Objects in the Judges' Lodgings, Lancaster